Musa gracilis is a species of wild banana (genus Musa), native to Peninsular Malaysia. It is placed in section Callimusa (now including the former section Australimusa), having a diploid chromosome number of 2n = 20. It has an upright pink-purple bud and produces narrow fruits (bananas), which have magenta and green stripes.

Gallery

References

gracilis
Endemic flora of Peninsular Malaysia
Plants described in 1950